The first season of Wizards of Waverly Place aired on Disney Channel from October 12, 2007 to August 31, 2008.
The season introduces the Russo children, Alex (Selena Gomez), Justin (David Henrie), and Max Russo (Jake T. Austin) as they compete to become the leading wizard in their family. Maria Canals Barrera and David DeLuise star as their parents and Jennifer Stone co-stars as Alex's best friend, Harper Finkle.

Guest stars and recurring cast include: Amanda Tepe as Monotone Woman, Skyler Samuels as Gigi Hollingsworth, Bill Chott as Mr. Laritate, Daryl Sabara as T.J. Taylor, Brian Kubach as Riley, Shane Lyons as Manny Kin, Eric Allan Kramer as Coach Gunderson, Chelsea Staub as Kari Landsdorf, Sara Paxton as Millie, Julie Brown as Ms. Angela and Jeff Garlin as Uncle Kelbo.

Production
The series was created and as executive produced by Todd J. Greenwald, who began developing the show after working as a writer and consulting producer during the first season of Hannah Montana. The show is produced by It's a Laugh Productions and Disney Channel Original Productions. The theme song, "Everything Is Not What It Seems", written by John Adair and Steve Hampton, is of techno-pop style and is performed by Selena Gomez. The series is filmed at Hollywood Center Studios in Hollywood, California.

Premise
Set on Waverly Place in Manhattan, New York's Greenwich Village neighborhood, Wizards of Waverly Place centers on the Italian-Mexican Russo family, which includes Alex (Selena Gomez), her older brother Justin (David Henrie) and their younger brother Max (Jake T. Austin). The three Russo siblings are wizards in training and live with their Italian-American father Jerry (David DeLuise), a former wizard, and their Mexican-American mother Theresa, who is a mortal.  Alex also has a mortal friend, Harper (Jennifer Stone), who at first does not know the Russos are wizards.

Theme song
The theme song begins with Alex (Selena Gomez) waking up in the morning with her alarm clock going off. She uses a spell to make the time 6:30. She then goes into the bathroom where Justin (David Henrie) is looking at himself in the mirror and spitting out mouthwash when Alex pushes him to the side. He gets annoyed and then uses magic to trap her in the mirror. In the kitchen, Max (Jake T. Austin) has an orange which he turns into a vanilla cupcake. Meanwhile, Harper (Jennifer Stone) meets Alex at the front door and shows off her watermelon shirt. Back at the kitchen, Max is about to put his cupcake into his backpack when his mother, Theresa (Maria Canals Barrera), makes him turn it back into an orange. Alex is telling Max to hurry up. In the lair, Jerry (David DeLuise) is yelling to someone when a laptop flies away. He then goes to retrieve it. In the sub shop, Alex opens her book bag, which the laptop goes into (meanwhile Harper was distracted not seeing anything). Jerry lectures her as the main title card appears. Then the four friends walk to school. Throughout the sequence, the furniture in the background seems to be moving around.

Release
The show debuted on Disney Channel on October 12, 2007 after the premiere of Twitches Too, gathering 5.9 million viewers. In February 2009, the episode "Helping Hand" broke the record for the largest audience in the 7:00 PM (Eastern Time) time period on the Disney Channel, with a total of 4.5 million viewers. In January 2010, "Wizards vs. Werewolves" one-hour special episode became the series' most-watched episode with 6.2 million viewers, surpassing the 6 million viewers of "Paint By Committee" episode In 2009, the series was the top scripted telecast for teens between the age of 9–14 (1.63 million/6.7 rating) and second in kids 6–11 (1.81 million/7.4 rating), which was only slightly behind "The Suite Life on Deck" (1.82 million/7.4 rating.)

Cast 
 Selena Gomez as Alex Russo
 David Henrie as Justin Russo
 Jake T. Austin as Max Russo
 Jennifer Stone as Harper Finkle
 Maria Canals Barrera as Theresa Russo
 David DeLuise as Jerry Russo

Episodes

References

2007 American television seasons
2008 American television seasons
Wizards of Waverly Place